Enrique Matías Ossorio Crespo (born 27 June 1959) is a Spanish politician from the People's Party of the Community of Madrid (PP), serving as Cabinet Minister of Education and Youth of the Community of Madrid since August 2019, and previously as Cabinet Minister of Economy and Finance between September 2012 and June 2015. He is also serving as acting Spokesperson of the Government, Cabinet Minister of Science, Universities and Innovation and of Culture and Tourism since March 2021.

References

1959 births
Living people
People's Party (Spain) politicians
People from Badajoz
Members of the 10th Assembly of Madrid
Members of the 11th Assembly of Madrid